"Hawak Kamay" (Hand in Hand; literally "Holding Hands") is a song by Filipina singer-songwriter Yeng Constantino, the winner of the ABS-CBN TV program Pinoy Dream Academy in 2006. Solely written by Constantino, the song is about a cousin with whom she developed a deep friendship. In 2006, it won the Best Theme Song at the 32nd Metro Manila Film Festival. The song is also used in the 2011 film, Won't Last a Day Without You.

Background and writing

Constantino wrote "Hawak Kamay" at age 14, inspired by a cousin who had left their hometown to live away from her. She performed the song for the first time live on Pinoy Dream Academy. During that time, she sang the song along with her fellow contestants Ronnie Liang, Davey Langit, Joan Ilagan and Jun Hirano. Following public demand, the song was released by Star Music. The song is the most successful single to date in Constantino's career.

Versions
 1st version - used in the Pinoy Dream Academy days. This version appears on Pinoy Dream Academy Originals Vol. 1.
 2nd version - used as the theme song for the movie Kasal, Kasali, Kasalo. 
 3rd version - made for her debut album, Salamat.
 4th version - used as the horror film from Braso (Arm) grabs Sam Concepcion, AJ Perez and Robi Domingo in the movie Cinco.
 5th version - used of karaoke as the horror film in The Healing.

Cover versions
 Sharlene San Pedro of Goin' Bulilit covered the song alongside actor Nash Aguas.
 In August 2011, David DiMuzio made and uploaded an English version cover "I'm By Your Side" on YouTube.
 On October 2, 2013, Xela Padua used the song on Eat Bulaga!'''s "Ka-Voice ni Idol" during wild card week.
 In June 2014, Filipino actor and singer Piolo Pascual covered the song for Hawak Kamay.

Award nominations
 Best Theme Song (Kasal Kasali Kasalos "Hawak Kamay"): 32nd Metro Manila Film Festival
 Pop Movie Theme Song (Kasal Kasali Kasalo'''s "Hawak Kamay"): ASAP Pop Viewer's Choice Awards 2007
 Best Theme Song (Kasal Kasali Kasalos "Hawak Kamay"): 55th FAMAS Awards 2007
 Extremely Requested Videoke Song ("Hawak Kamay"): 2nd IFM Pinoy Music Awards

Live performances
Constantino first performed this song on Pinoy Dream Academy, together with her fellow contestants Ronnie Liang, Davey Langit, Joan Ilagan and Jun Hirano. She has performed the song several times on the ABS-CBN weekend variety showASAP, which airs on Sundays.

The song was performed by Constantino herself on the first anniversary of the ULTRA Stampede during the second anniversary of show Wowowee as the show chose not to celebrate its second anniversary out of respect for the disaster's victims and their kin.

In September 2009, she performed the song on Umagang Kay Ganda as a tribute for the victims of Typhoon Ondoy (international name Ketsana). In August 2011, she performed a medley of "Hawak Kamay" and her song "Lapit" on Eat Bulaga!.
On December 9, 2011, Constantino and American singer/songwriter David DiMuzio performed a duet of "Hawak Kamay (I'm By Your Side)" in Taglish on ASAP Rocks.

References

2006 debut singles
2006 songs
Yeng Constantino songs
Star Music singles
Tagalog-language songs